Cephalodella elegans is a species of rotifers in the family Notommatidae.

References

External links 
 

Ploima
Animals described in 1924